Tropical nursing is a nursing specialty predominantly undertaken in tropical and subtropical regions. These regions generally have underdeveloped health services and a lack of essential healthcare staff, including registered nurses and midwives.

Professional Diploma in Tropical Nursing – London
Registered nurses and midwives can undertake the 19-week (P/T) Diploma in Tropical Nursing at the London School of Hygiene and Tropical Medicine. This course is intended for nurses and midwives who have travelled or worked in developing countries, or who hope to do so. The course director is Dame Claire Bertschinger who is world renowned and has written an autobiography, Moving Mountains. The LSHTM has a leaflet that gives more information.

Diploma in Tropical Nursing – Liverpool
The Liverpool School of Tropical Medicine runs the Diploma in Tropical Nursing as a three-week intensive programme. It is designed for registered nurses and midwives who intend to work in developing countries. The course will provide a wide knowledge base, incorporating laboratory work, clinical aspects of infectious diseases, child health, sexual health, neglected tropical diseases, non-communicable diseases as well as professional topics such as leading change, public health, governance and ethics.

This diploma course is available to registered nurses and midwives. It is recommended that you have a minimum of two years post-qualification experience.

Recognition of the DipTN 
Medecins Sans Frontieres, Save the Children Voluntary Services Overseas (VSO) and the British Red Cross are some of the international agencies that recommend the DipTN.

Book on Tropical Nursing
A reliable source of general information is Nursing and Midwifery – A Practical Approach by Sally Huband, Pam Hamilton-Brown and Gillian Barber. The book focuses on Nursing and Midwifery in Africa. It is published by Macmillan Publishers Ltd. but distributed by Teaching Aids at Low Cost.

Books on Tropical Medicine
The Oxford Handbook of Tropical Medicine (4th Ed) is an authoritative reference guide to tropical medicine that is a practical evidence-based guide for all healthcare professionals working in low-resource / tropical settings. The handbook includes advice about nursing issues alongside the medical information. 

Manson's Tropical Diseases (22nd Ed) continues to be a comprehensive and detailed textbook for Tropical Diseases. This book does not consider the role of the nurse in caring for patients with tropical diseases.

References 

Health care occupations
Nursing specialties
Nursing